This article provides details of international football games played by the Indonesia women's national football team from 1975 to 1999.

Results

1977

1981

1982

1985

1986

1989

1997

References

Indonesia women's national football team results
1970s in Indonesian sport
1980s in Indonesian sport
1990s in Indonesian sport